Mount Clay is a peak located in Thompson and Meserve's Purchase in Coos County in the Presidential Range of the White Mountains of New Hampshire.

The  Mt. Clay Loop passes over the summit.

The mountain is named for Henry Clay, 19th-century senator and U.S. Secretary of State from Kentucky, known as "The Great Compromiser". In 2003, the New Hampshire state legislature, participating in a Reagan Legacy project, made it state law that Mt. Clay "shall hereafter be called and known as Mount Reagan," after President Ronald Reagan. The legal force of this is limited to actions by the state of New Hampshire.  The U.S. Board on Geographic Names (BGN) voted in May 2010 not to change the name of the mountain. Maps used in connection with foot travel in the Presidentials are typically published by the U.S. Geological Survey (which adheres by law to BGN's naming), and by the Appalachian Mountain Club and two New England companies, all three of whom  use "Clay" and make no mention of "Reagan".

References

External links 
PeakBagger.com: Mount Clay
FAQs: "Why are some 4000-foot peaks not on the list?", which answers why Mount Clay is excluded by the Appalachian Mountain Club

Mountains of New Hampshire
White Mountains (New Hampshire)
Mountains of Coös County, New Hampshire